Concours d'Elegance (French: concours d'élégance) is a term of French origin that means a "competition of elegance" and refers to an event where prestigious vehicles are displayed and judged. It dates back to 17th-century France, where aristocrats paraded horse-drawn carriages in the parks of Paris during summer weekends and holidays. Over time, carriages became horseless and the gatherings became a competition among vehicle owners to be judged on the appearance of their vehicles. These events are often held at automobile shows, after racing competitions or, especially in the United States, as a fundraising event for charities.

Many modern events also feature corporate exhibitions from luxury and hypercar brands.

History
The oldest still-extant Concours, the Concorso d'Eleganza Villa d'Este, is held annually near the Villa d’Este hotel in Cernobbio, on Lake Como in Italy. The first of these was held in September 1929. The first Concours in North America was held in 1950 at the Pebble Beach Golf Links in Monterey, California, in conjunction with the first Pebble Beach Road Race. The longest continually-running event is the Hillsborough Concours d’Elegance in California, which has been held every year since 1956 (both Villa d'Este and Pebble Beach have skipped years since 1956).

Judging
Numerous local organizations sponsor Concours events. Traditionally, vehicle judging at a Concours is more demanding than that of a local  neighborhood or general automobile show. Trained judges examine the vehicle thoroughly. They rate each and every component. Only those vehicles that are judged perfect (or very nearly so) in every way are considered eligible for trophy class.

Often, the competitiveness of a Concours d'Elegance forces restoration of a vehicle to surpass "mint" condition. Mint condition would be the state of the vehicle when it originally left the factory. Concours-quality cars are often given upholstery, paint, plating, and mechanical restoration to a standard far exceeding that of the car when it was new.

Concours d'Elegance competitions also are run for classic cars. Here, the emphasis is as much on originality as the condition, although this also is very important. The general aim is to present a vehicle that is in the same, or better, condition than it was in when it left the production line. Unless original, modifications are not allowed, and components must be suitable for the year and model of the automobile. Even components or features fitted to automobiles of the same type, but in a different production year or trim level, are not allowed. Original-equipment accessories from the manufacturers' own range are allowed and some competitions allow after-market equipment and accessories, provided they are of the correct period. The automobiles must be presented in flawless visual condition, as with other Concours-grade cars.

Events

Partial list of some of the Concours.

References

 
Conservation and restoration of vehicles